The MillionMile Greenway (MMG) is an organization and system of connected greenways across metropolitan Atlanta, the state of Georgia and the eastern United States. MMG intends to help individuals and local communities begin or expand their efforts at conservation and recreation.

Purpose
The MillionMile Greenway is a non-profit organization which acts as a mentor for people who want to preserve greenspace. Each section of the MillionMile Greenway aims to conserve greenspace, provide recreation for the public and connect to an existing greenspace. The MillionMile Greenway aims to achieve a balance between population growth and conservation of land and water resources for parks, trails and natural spaces.

Affiliates
MillionMile Greenway affiliates are community organizations and organized citizens' groups. Current affiliates include:

References

External links
 MillionMile Greenway Web site
 The Appalachian Trail Conservancy Web site
 The Coastal Georgia Greenway Web site
 Friends of the Mountains-to-Sea Trail Web site
 Georgia Pinhoti Trail Association Web site
 Mountain Conservation Trust of Georgial Web site
 Madison Greenway & Trails Web site
 Northeast Georgia Regional Development Center Web site
 East Coast Greenway Alliance Web site
 The Yahoola Creek Trails Conservancy Web site

Non-profit organizations based in Georgia (U.S. state)